Gim Se-yeong may refer to:

 Kim Se-young (Hanja: 金洗瑩, born 1981), South Korean volleyball player
 Kim Sei-young (Hanja: 金世煐, born 1993), South Korean golfer
 Kim Se-young, known as Procxin (born 1995), Korean League of Legends player